Apang may refer to:

People
Gegong Apang, Indian politician
Minam Apang, an artist recognized by the New Museum in New York City in 2012, see List of New Museum Triennial Artists
Omak Apang, Indian politician
Ona Apang (botanical abbreviation: Apang), a published botanist, see List of botanists by author abbreviation (A)
Otu Apang, a student leader, a 2016-2017 executive of the Students' Union of Rajiv Gandhi Government Polytechnic (SURGGP), Itanagar

Places
 Apang, Alilem, Ilocos Sur, Ilocos, Luzon, Philippines; a barangay (barrio), see List of barangays in Ilocos Sur
Apang Palace (University of Cambridge spelling), the imperial palace of the Qin Dynasty in Xian, the palace of the First Emperor of China

Other uses
Apang, a traditional alcoholic beverage of India found in Assam
Apang Mitra, organization

See also

 
 
 Pang (disambiguation)